The Malaysian Amateur Radio Transmitters' Society (MARTS) is a non-profit organisation for amateur radio enthusiasts in Malaysia.  MARTS was founded in 1952 and became a National Society ever since.  The organisation's primary mission is to popularise and promote amateur radio in Malaysia.  One membership benefit of the organisation is a QSL bureau for members who regularly make communications with amateur radio operators in other countries.  MARTS is the member society representing Malaysia in the International Amateur Radio Union.

See also 
 Singapore Amateur Radio Transmitting Society

References 

Malaysia
Clubs and societies in Malaysia
Organizations established in 1952
1952 establishments in Malaya
Organisations based in Kuala Lumpur
Radio in Malaysia